No. 286 Squadron RAF was a non-operational Second World War Royal Air Force squadron that operated a variety of aircraft to provide targets for anti-aircraft gun practice in the West Country of England.

History
The squadron was formed at RAF Filton on 17 November 1941 from No. 10 Group AAC Flight.

From 24 January 1942 the squadron was headquartered at newly operational RAF Lulsgate Bottom. However, as the facilities there were still unfinished, from 2 March to 30 April the headquarters used RAF Colerne. It returned to Lulsgate only briefly before leaving for RAF Zeals on 26 May.

The squadron served at various locations and detachments around the west country before finally moving to RAF Weston Zoyland, where it was disbanded on 16 May 1945.

Aircraft operated

References

Notes

Bibliography

 Halley, James J. The Squadrons of the Royal Air Force and Commonwealth, 1918-1988. Tonbridge, Kent, UK: Air Britain (Historians) Ltd., 1988. .
 James, Ian. The Story of RAF Lulsgate Bottom. Bristol: Redcliffe Press, 1989. .
 Jefford, C.G. RAF Squadrons: A Comprehensive Record of the Movement and Equipment of All RAF Squadrons and Their Antecedents Since 1912, Shrewsbury, Shropshire, UK: Airlife Publishing, 1988. . (second revised edition 2001. .)
 Rawlings, John D.R. Coastal, Support and Special Squadrons of the RAF and their Aircraft. London: Jane's Publishing Company Ltd., 1982. .

External links
 squadron histories nos. 286-290 sqn

Aircraft squadrons of the Royal Air Force in World War II
286 Squadron
Military units and formations disestablished in 1945
Military units and formations established in 1941